Gubbi Mele Brhmastra is a 2019 Indian Kannada romantic comedy film written and directed by Sujay Shastry making his debut. The film is produced by T.R.Chandrashekhar under his banner Crystal Park Cinemas. It features Raj B. Shetty and Kavitha Gowda in the lead roles. The supporting cast includes Pramod Shetty, Shobraj, Babu Hiranniah, Manjunath Hedge and Aruna Balraj. The score and soundtrack for the film is by Manikanth Kadri. The cinematography is by Suneeth Halgeri and editing is done by Srikanth Shroff.

Cast 
 Raj B. Shetty as Venkata Krishna Gubbi
 Kavitha Gowda as Purple Priya
 Sujay Shastri as Nonda Nani
 Pramod Shetty as Robinhood
 Shobhraj as Venkat Reddy
 Babu Hirannaiah as Father of Purple Priya
 Manjunatha Hegde as Gopalkrishna Gubbi
 Aruna Balraj as Rukmini Gubbi
 Girish Shivanna as Alphesh Kumar
Special appearance in "Swagatam Krishna" song:
 Shubha Punja 
 Karunya Ram
 Rachana

Production and release 
The film began with its principal photography on 18 June 2018 and followed its shoot from the next day. The film had Raj B.Shetty on board first followed by Kavitha Gowda. The film completed its shooting on 1 April 2019. The film team had earlier announced 9 August as the release date on account of Varamahalakshmi festival but later they postponed it a week later on 15 August on account of Independence Day to avoid clashes with other films.

Soundtrack 

The film's background score and the soundtracks are composed by Manikanth Kadri The music rights were acquired by Crystal Music

Reception 
The Times of India paper rated 3/5 and wrote "Comedian Sujay Shastry makes his debut as a director with Gubbi Mele Brahmastra. He does a decent job and also hints at a possible sequel to this film. While one has seen blatant slapstick humour and loads of double entendres in Kannada comedy films, this one has a tad more cleaner approach to the genre.Raj B Shetty seems to have an extension of his character from Ondu Motteya Kathe and he shines. Sujay, as Raj's pessimistic philosopher friend, is a hoot. Each of the cast member seems to be carefully picked. Be it Girish Shivanna as the comical inspector or Pramod Shetty as the costume wearing don, they all shine. Though, at times the gags are dragged a bit. But, for those who like comedy, Gubbi Mele Brahmastra is going to be a treat, as it is reminiscent of some of the classics from the 80s and 90s."

References

External links 

 

2010s Kannada-language films
Indian romantic comedy films
2019 directorial debut films
2019 films
Films shot in Mysore
Films shot in Bangalore
2019 romantic comedy films